Zouhair Maghzaoui, born 1965, is a Tunisian politician and Secretary-General of the People's Movement political party since 2013 succeeding the assassinated Mohamed Brahmi.

References

1965 births
Living people
Tunisian politicians